Here are lists of schools which only admit girls in Hong Kong.

Hong Kong Island
 Central and Western District
Secondary Aided
 St. Clare's Girls' School
 St Stephen's Girls' College
 Ying Wa Girls' School
Primary Aided
 Sacred Heart Canossian School (嘉諾撒聖心學校)
 St Stephen's Girls' Primary School (聖士提反女子中學附屬小學)
Primary Private
 Sacred Heart Canossian School, Private Section (嘉諾撒聖心學校私立部)
 St Clare's Primary School (聖嘉勒小學)
Kindergarten
 St Clare's Primary School (聖嘉勒小學)
 St Stephen's Girls' College Kindergarten (聖士提反女子中學附屬幼稚園)

Eastern District
Secondary Government
 Belilios Public School
Secondary Aided
 Canossa College (嘉諾撒書院)
 Precious Blood Secondary School (寶血女子中學)

Southern District
Secondary Aided
 Hong Kong True Light College
  (嘉諾撒培德書院)
 Sacred Heart Canossian College
Primary Aided
 Pui Tak Canossian Primary School (嘉諾撒培德學校)
Special Aided
 Marycove School (瑪利灣學校)

Wan Chai District
Secondary Government
  (何東中學)
Secondary Aided
 Marymount Secondary School
 St Francis' Canossian College 
 St Paul's Secondary School
 True Light Middle School of Hong Kong 
Secondary Direct Subsidy Scheme
 St Paul's Convent School (聖保祿學校)
Primary Aided
 Marymount Primary School (瑪利曼小學)
 St Francis' Canossian School (嘉諾撒聖方濟各學校)
Primary Private
 St Paul's Convent School (Primary Section) (聖保祿學校（小學部）)
 St Paul's Primary Catholic School (聖保祿天主教小學)

Kowloon
Kowloon City District
Secondary Aided
 Holy Family Canossian College (嘉諾撒聖家書院)
 Kowloon True Light School (九龍真光中學)
 Maryknoll Convent School (Secondary Section) (瑪利諾修院學校（中學部）)
 Pooi To Middle School (香港培道中學)
 St. Teresa Secondary School (德蘭中學)
Secondary Direct Subsidy
 Heep Yunn School (協恩中學)
Primary Aided
 Heep Yunn Primary School (協恩中學附屬小學)
 Holy Angels Canossian School (天神嘉諾撒學校)
 Holy Family Canossian School (Kowloon Tong) (嘉諾撒聖家學校（九龍塘）)
 Holy Family Canossian School (嘉諾撒聖家學校)
 Maryknoll Convent School (Primary Section) (瑪利諾修院學校（小學部）)
 St Rose of Lima's School (聖羅撒學校)
Kindergarten
 Heep Yunn School Private Kindergarten (協恩中學附屬幼稚園)
Others
 Integritas Education Centre (品學堂教育中心)

Kwun Tong District
Secondary Aided
  (梁式芝書院)
  (聖安當女書院)
 St Catharine's School for Girls (聖傑靈女子中學)
 St Paul's School (Lam Tin) (藍田聖保祿中學)
Special Aided
 Caritas Mother Teresa School (明愛樂恩學校)

Sham Shui Po District
Secondary Aided
 Holy Trinity College (寶血會上智英文書院)
 Our Lady of the Rosary College (聖母玫瑰書院)
 Tack Ching Girls' Secondary School (德貞女子中學)
 Tak Nga Secondary School (德雅中學)

Wong Tai Sin District
Secondary Aided
  (潔心林炳炎中學)
 Our Lady's College (聖母書院)
 Tak Oi Secondary School (德愛中學)
Secondary Direct Subsidy
 Good Hope School (德望學校)
Private Primary
 Good Hope Primary School cum Kindergarten (德望小學暨幼稚園)
 Our Lady's Primary School (聖母小學)
Special Aided
 Caritas Pelletier School (明愛培立學校)
Kindergarten
 Good Hope Primary School cum Kindergarten

Yau Tsim Mong District
Secondary Aided
 St Mary's Canossian College (嘉諾撒聖瑪利書院)
 True Light Girls' College (真光女書院)
Secondary Direct Subsidy
 Diocesan Girls' School (拔萃女書院)
Primary Aided
 St Mary's Canossian School (嘉諾撒聖瑪利學校)
Primary Private
 Diocesan Girls' Junior School (拔萃女小學)

New Territories
East
Sha Tin District
  (聖羅撒書院) (Secondary Aided)

West
Kwai Tsing District
 DMHC Siu Ming Catholic Secondary School (天主教母佑會蕭明中學) (Secondary Aided)
 Pope Paul VI College (保祿六世書院) (Secondary Aided)
Tuen Mun District
  (妙法寺劉金龍中學) (Secondary Aided)

Former girls' schools
 Lai Chack Middle School, now coeducational
 St. Paul's Girls' College, now St. Paul's Co-educational College

References

External links

Girls

Hong Kong